John White (1850 – 1932) was a British photographer and postcard publisher, and Littlehampton's leading photographer in the 1880s and 1890s. By 1903, he had taken his son Arthur Harold White into the business and was trading as J. White & Son.

Early life
John White was born in Lyminster, Sussex in 1850, one of seven children of Thomas White, cattle dealer and drover, and his wife Betsy Cheal.

Career
White set up a photographic studio at 11 River Road, Littlehampton, Sussex,  in about 1874, with the money coming from "a monetary award that was made to him for his part in providing information which led to the apprehension of a smuggler". In June 1876, he relocated to 32 High Street, Littlehampton, and stayed there for more than twenty years.

By 1903, he had taken his son Arthur Harold White into the business and was trading as J. White & Son, and in 1904 was employing about a dozen people.

It is estimated that J. White & Son produced at least 2-3,000 different postcards.

Personal life
On 20 July 1876, White married Alice Arnott, the daughter of Mary and Frederick Arnott, a London coachman from Shepherd's Bush.

References

External links

1850 births
1932 deaths
Photographers from Sussex
Postcard publishers
People from Littlehampton
People from Lyminster